The State of Judea (Medīnat Yəhuda) is a proposed halachic state in the West Bank put forward by Israeli Jewish settlers. After the Palestine Liberation Organization (PLO) declared the existence of a Palestinian state in 1988, some settler activists (primarily Kahanists) feared that international pressure would lead Israel to withdraw from the West Bank and sought to lay the groundwork for an Orthodox Jewish state in the West Bank if this came to pass.  The establishment of this state was announced in a Jerusalem hotel on December 27, 1988. Veteran Kahanist, Michael Ben-Horin, was declared president of the state of Judea. In January 1989 several hundred activists met and announced their intention to create such a state if Israel withdrew. 

The idea was revived following the unilateral disengagement plan which resulted in the forcible withdrawal of Jewish settlers from Gaza by the Israeli Defense Force in 2005. In 2007 Rabbi Shalom Dov Wolpo suggested the establishment of a new state in the West Bank in the event of Israeli withdrawal.

Flag
The flag of Judea is very similar to the flag of Israel. Like the flag of Israel, it depicts a blue symbol on a white background, between two horizontal blue stripes, but unlike the flag of Israel the symbol is a Temple menorah instead of a Star of David. Another version features a Star of David of a different sort than appears on the flag of Israel, together with some other symbols.

References

External links

Israeli settlement
Religious Zionism
Kahanism
Proposed countries